This is a list of those dramatists who wrote their work in the Urdu language. Despite the historical presence of Sanskrit dramas, the history of Urdu drama is begins only with British influences on Urdu in the 19th century. Today Urdu drama has been developed as a separate branch of Urdu literature.

List

References

External links 
 Saksina, Ram Babu: Tareekh e Adab Urdu (ebook at Rekhta.org)